Pain 3 is a mixtape by American rapper Derez De'Shon. It was released on August 21, 2020, through Commission Music and BMG Rights Management. The mixtape features guest appearances from A Boogie wit da Hoodie, Boosie Badazz, G 5aby, Paxquiao and Ralo. The production on the mixtape was handled by Southside, London on da Track, and Drumma Boy, among others.

The mixtape was supported by the one and only single: "Calm Down". The mixtape serves as a sequel to the 2018 album Pain 2, and the third installment of the Pain series. The album charted at number 10 on the US Heatseekers Albums chart. This project marks as Derez's final release under the BMG and Commission label imprints.

Release and promotion 
In February 7, 2020, Derez De'Shon released two songs — "How Many Shots" and "Party Pack". The music video for the song "How Many Shots", was released on May 29, 2020. Both songs was not included on the mixtape.

The mixtape's one and only single, "Calm Down", was released on August 7, 2020. The music video for the song was released on August 21, 2020, on the same day as the mixtape's release.

The music video for the song "Trappin Out da Mansion", was released on August 24, 2020, two days after the mixtape's release. The second music video, "No Mo Pain", was released on August 28, 2020. The third music video, "Get the Money", was released on September 4, 2020. The fourth music video, "Alot Changed", was released on September 9, 2020. The fifth and last music video, "Mental", was released on September 18, 2020.

Commercial performance 
On September 5, 2020, Pain 3 debuted at number 10 on the US Heatseekers Albums chart, making Derez De'Shon first top-10 project on the chart.

Track listing 
Credits adapted by Tidal and Genius.

Notes 

  signifies an uncredited co-producer
  signifies an additional producer

Personnel 
Credits adapted from Tidal.

Vocalists 
 Derez De'Shon – primary artist
 A Boogie wit da Hoodie – featured artist (track 4)
 Boosie Badazz – featured artist (track 7)
 G 5aby – featured artist (track 11)
 Paxquiao – featured artist (track 11)
 Ralo – featured artist (track 13)

Production 
 SephGotTheWaves – producer (track 1)
 JR Hitmaker – producer (track 1)
 Off The Wall – producer (tracks 2, 4, 6 and 9)
 Platinum Libraries – uncredited co-producer (track 2)
 Southside – producer (tracks 3, 7, 16)
 London on da Track – producer (tracks 4-6, 12, 13 and 18)
 Roark Bailey – additional producer (tracks 4 and 11)
 Dez Wright – producer (track 5)
 Boobie – producer (tracks 5 and 11)
 K Rich – producer (tracks 8, 11 and 17)
 Wavy Pluto – producer (track 10)
 Kzuni – producer (track 12)
 Drumma Boy – producer (track 14)
 ADP – producer (track 15)
 Vou – producer (track 18)
 Don Salute – producer (track 19)

Technical 
 Glenn Schick – engineer (all tracks)
 KY – engineer (tracks 1 and 15)
 June Jonez – engineer (tracks 2-14, 16-19)
 Roark Bailey – engineer (tracks 2-14, 16-19)

Charts

References 

2021 mixtape albums
Albums produced by London on da Track
Albums produced by Southside (record producer)
BMG Rights Management albums
Hip hop albums by American artists
Trap music albums